Night Creature is a 1978 American horror film starring Donald Pleasence and Nancy Kwan. Its plot follows a group of visitors on an island who are stalked by a vicious leopard that a big-game hunter has let loose to hunt.

Plot

Cast

External links

Night Creature at TCMDB

1978 films
American horror films
1978 horror films
Dimension Pictures films
1970s English-language films
Films directed by Lee Madden
1970s American films